Coleophora neviusiella is a moth of the family Coleophoridae. It is found in eastern China and Primorye in the Russian Far East.

The larvae feed on the leaves of Malus, Prunus and Rubus species.

References

neviusiella
Moths described in 1904
Moths of Asia